Black Hole Entertainment (also known as Black Hole Games) was a Hungarian video game developer, founded in 2001 in Budapest by seven young game enthusiasts.

The company's first title was Armies of Exigo, developed with the financial backing of Andy Vajna, published by Electronic Arts and released in the end of 2004. The team has developed Warhammer: Mark of Chaos and Warhammer: Battle March, an expansion for Mark of Chaos, which were released on November 14, 2006 and September 16, 2008, respectively, for the PC. Warhammer: Battle March was also released for the Xbox 360 game console on September 2, 2008.

Black Hole developed the sixth installment of the Heroes of Might and Magic series, Might & Magic Heroes VI, in collaboration with Ubisoft. The title was released in October 2011, postponed from its original launch date of March. The studio was reported in various media  to have gone bankrupt as a result of the nature of this development, and members of the company blamed Ubisoft for the mistake. As of July 2012, the company is no longer operating.

Games developed
 Armies of Exigo - 2004
 Warhammer: Mark of Chaos - 2006
 Warhammer: Battle March (expansion for Warhammer: Mark of Chaos) - 2008
 Might & Magic Heroes VI - October 2011

References
 (last 2 are defunct)

External links
 Official site (defunct)

2012 disestablishments in Hungary
Video game companies established in 2001
Video game companies disestablished in 2012
Companies based in Budapest
Defunct video game companies of Hungary
Video game development companies
Hungarian companies established in 2001